Timandra extremaria is a species of moth of the family Geometridae first described by Francis Walker in 1861. It is found in Taiwan.

References

Moths described in 1861
Timandrini